Prime Doleshwar Sporting Club is a Bangladeshi cricket team that plays List A cricket in the Dhaka Premier League and Twenty20 cricket in the Dhaka Premier Division Twenty20 Cricket League.

List A record
 2013-14: 15 matches, won 10, finished third
 2014-15: 16 matches, won 12, finished fourth
 2015-16: 16 matches, won 10, finished second
 2016-17: 16 matches, won 12, finished second
 2017-18: 16 matches, won 8, finished fourth
 2018-19: 16 matches, won 10, finished third
Farhad Reza was captain in 2013–14, Elias Sunny in 2014–15, and Farhad Reza again from 2015–16 to 2018–19.

They were scheduled to take part in the 2021-22 tournament but withdrew shortly before it began, leaving 11 teams to compete.

Twenty20 record
Prime Doleshwar were runners-up in the inaugural tournament of the Dhaka Premier Division Twenty20 Cricket League in 2018–19 when they lost to Sheikh Jamal Dhanmondi in the final by 24 runs. Farhad Reza, Prime Doleshwar's captain, was named player of the tournament.

Current squad
Players with international caps are listed in bold

Records
Prime Doleshwar's highest List A score is 148 not out by Saif Hassan in 2018–19, and the best bowling figures are 6 for 19 by Taijul Islam in 2013–14.

References

External links
 Prime Doleshwar Sporting Club at CricketArchive

Dhaka Premier Division Cricket League teams